Moscow is the name of two unincorporated communities in the US state of Alabama:

 Moscow, Lamar County, Alabama 
 Moscow, Marengo County, Alabama